Aqua Tofana (also known as Acqua Toffana and Aqua Tufania and Manna di San Nicola) was a strong poison created in Sicily around 1630 that was reputedly widely used in Palermo, Naples, Perugia, and Rome, Italy. It has been associated with Giulia Tofana, or Tofania, a woman from Palermo, purportedly the leader of a ring of six poisoners in Rome, who sold Aqua Tofana to would-be widows.

Original creation 
The first recorded mention of Aqua Tofana is from 1632–33, when it was used by two women, Francesca la Sarda and Teofania di Adamo, to poison their victims. It may have been invented by, and named after, Teofania. She was executed for her crimes, but several women associated with her including Giulia Tofana (who may have been her daughter) and Gironima Spana moved on to Rome and continued manufacturing and distributing the poison.  

The 'tradename' "Manna di San Nicola" ("Manna of St. Nicholas of Bari") may have been a marketing device intended to divert the authorities, given that the poison was openly sold both as a cosmetic and a devotionary object in vials that included a picture of St. Nicholas. Over 600 victims are alleged to have died from this poison, mostly husbands, in a time when women had few rights and little protection. 

Between 1666 and 1676 the Marchioness de Brinvilliers poisoned her father and two brothers, amongst others, and she was executed on July 16, 1676.

Ingredients 
The active ingredients of the mixture are basically known, but not how they were blended. Aqua Tofana contained mostly arsenic and lead, and possibly belladonna. It was a colorless, tasteless liquid and therefore easily mixed with water or wine to be served during meals.

Symptoms 
Poisoning by Aqua Tofana could go unnoticed, as the substance is clear and has no taste. It is slow acting, with symptoms resembling those of a progressive disease or other natural causes. The symptoms seen are similar to the effects of arsenic poisoning. Several symptoms were reported by those poisoned by Aqua Tofana. The first small dosage would produce cold-like symptoms. The victim was very ill by the third dose; symptoms included vomiting, dehydration, diarrhea, and a burning sensation in the digestive system. The fourth dose would kill the victim. As it was slow acting, it allowed victims time to prepare for their death, including writing a will and repenting. The antidote often given was vinegar and lemon juice.

Legend about Mozart 
The legend that Wolfgang Amadeus Mozart (1756–1791) was poisoned using Aqua Tofana is completely unsubstantiated, even though it was Mozart himself who started this rumor.

References

External links 
 Definition at thefreedictionary.com
 Definition at infoplease.com

Poisons
Arsenic